The 2011 Women's Basketball Invitational (WBI) was a single-elimination tournament of 16 National Collegiate Athletic Association (NCAA) Division I teams that did not participate in the 2011 NCAA Division I women's basketball tournament or 2011 Women's National Invitation Tournament. All games were hosted by the higher seed throughout the tournament, unless the higher seed's arena was unavailable. The championship game was hosted by the school with the higher end of the season RPI.  The UAB Blazers defeated the Cal State Bakersfield Roadrunners in the final.

West Region
#8 IPFW and #7 South Dakota hosted first round games

East Region
#5 Morehead State, and #7 Central Arkansas hosted first round games
#3 Elon hosted quarterfinal game
#5 Manhattan hosted semifinal game

WBI Championship Game
Hosted by UAB

References 

Women's Basketball Invitational
Women's Basketball Invitational